Slepian is a surname. Notable people with the surname include:

Barnett Slepian (1946–1998), American physician and OB/GYN who was shot and killed in his home by an anti-abortion activist, James Charles Kopp
David Slepian (1923–2007), American mathematician
Jan Slepian (1921–2016), author of books for children and young adults
Joseph Slepian (1891–1969), American electrical engineer known for his contributions to the developments of electrical apparatus and theory
Vladimir Slepian, a.k.a. Eric Pid (1930–1998), French artist and writer of Russian-Jewish origin

See also
Slepian's lemma, in probability theory, named after David Slepian